David Richard Kadela, Jr. (born May 6, 1978, Dublin, Ohio) is an American football player who played offensive lineman for the Carolina Panthers, Atlanta Falcons, and the Jacksonville Jaguars of the National Football League.

High school career
Kadela lettered two years in football and lacrosse at Dublin Coffman High School in Ohio.  He earned all-conference and all-district honors as a defensive end and offensive lineman.  He prepped for a year at Fork Union Military Academy in Fork Union, Virginia where he was recruited by Virginia Tech.

College career
He started his final 34 consecutive contests at right tackle for Virginia Tech, where he protected former Atlanta Falcons quarterback Michael Vick and gave up 1.5 sacks. He was named first-team All-Big East as a senior in 2000, and also garnered second-team All-Big East recognition as a junior in 1999.

Professional career
Kadela was signed as an undrafted free agent by the Atlanta Falcons before the 2001 NFL season.  After being waived by the Falcons before the season, he was signed and then released by the Jacksonville Jaguars. Atlanta re-signed him, and he spent the remainder of the season with the team. He spent most of the next season as a backup before being waived and signed by Jacksonville again. He was waived before the 2003 NFL season, and was picked up by the Panthers. Carolina allocated him to the Berlin Thunder of NFL Europe, and he started all 10 games for the Thunder. In addition to the team leading the league in offense and winning the World Bowl, he made the All-NFL Europe team. He was brought back to Carolina full-time for the 2004 season, where he played backup to Todd Fordham and Jordan Gross. He is no longer active in the NFL.

External links
Dave Kadela at Panthers.com

1978 births
Living people
American football offensive linemen
Atlanta Falcons players
Berlin Thunder players
Carolina Panthers players
Jacksonville Jaguars players
People from Dublin, Ohio
Virginia Tech Hokies football players